Leoglymmius is a genus of wrinkled bark beetles in the family Carabidae. Its only species is Leoglymmius lignarius. It is endemic to Australia.

References

Rhysodinae
Monotypic Carabidae genera
Beetles of Australia
Endemic fauna of Australia